Italy competed at the FIS Alpine World Ski Championships 1974 in St. Moritz, Switzerland, from 3 to 10 February 1974.

Medalists

Results

Men

Women

See also
 Italy at the FIS Alpine World Ski Championships
 Italy national alpine ski team

References

External links
 Italian Winter Sports Federation 

Nations at the FIS Alpine World Ski Championships 1974
Alpine World Ski Championships
Italy at the FIS Alpine World Ski Championships